The 1982 Maryland gubernatorial election was held on November 2, 1982. Incumbent Democrat Harry Hughes defeated Republican nominee Robert A. Pascal with 61.97% of the vote.

Primary elections
Primary elections were held on September 14, 1982.

Democratic primary

Candidates
Harry Hughes, incumbent Governor
Harry J. McGuirk, State Senator
Harry W. Kelley 	
John J. Schwartz

Results

Republican primary

Candidates
Robert A. Pascal, County Executive of Anne Arundel County
Ross Zimmerman Pierpont, perennial candidate

Results

General election

Candidates
Harry Hughes, Democratic
Robert A. Pascal, Republican

Results

References

1982
Maryland
Gubernatorial